This is a listing of the horses that finished in either first, second, or third place and the number of starters in the Blue Grass Stakes, an American Grade 1 race for three-year-olds at 1-1/8 miles held at Keeneland Racecourse in Lexington, Kentucky.  (List 1973–present)

References

External links
 Toyota Blue Grass Stakes official website
 Keeneland official website
  NTRA entry on Toyota Blue Grass Stakes

Lists of horse racing results
Keeneland
Horse racing in Lexington, Kentucky